Panthers is an American punk rock band from Brooklyn, New York City. The Village Voice described them as "groundbreaking dissonant HC (hardcore) with Rolling Stones swagger." Three members were previously in the hardcore band Orchid.  Panthers have released four records.  The most recent two, The Trick and Things Are Strange were released on Vice Records. Prior to that they released via Dim Mak Records and Troubleman Unlimited.

They began as a side project by members of the bands Orchid, Turing Machine, and The Red Scare.

Kip Uhlhorn went on to form the band Cloudland Canyon with Simon Wojan of King Khan & the Shrines.

Band members 
 Justin Chearno – guitar
 Jayson Green – vocals
 Geoff Garlock – bass
 Jeff Salane – drums
 Kip Uhlhorn – guitar

Releases 
 Are You Down?? (Troubleman Unlimited, 2002)
 Let's Get Serious EP (Dim Mak, 2003)
 Things Are Strange (Vice, 2004)
 The Trick (Vice, 2007)

References

External links 
Interview
Vice Records

 77 Boadrum Site Profile Viva Radio, September 2007 (Flash)

Punk rock groups from New York (state)
Hardcore punk groups from New York (state)
Atlantic Records artists
Musical groups from Brooklyn